is a passenger railway station on the Keisei Main Line in the city of Ichikawa, Chiba Japan, operated by the private railway operator Keisei Electric Railway.

Lines
Kōnodai Station is served by the Keisei Main Line, and is located 16.4 km from the terminus of the line at Keisei-Ueno Station.

Station layout
Kōnodai Station has two elevated opposed side platforms connected via an underpass to the station building underneath.

Platforms

History
However, the name was shortened to Ichikawa Station on 11 December of the same year. It resumed its former name on 6 April 1921, but with different kanji (市川国府台駅) for its name. The station assumed its current name on 1 April 1948.

Station numbering was introduced to all Keisei Line stations on 17 July 2010; Kōnodai was assigned station number KS13.

Passenger statistics
In fiscal 2019, the station was used by an average of 13,201 passengers daily.

Surrounding area
 Tokyo Medical & Dental University (Liberal Arts Department)
 Chiba University of Commerce
 Wayo Women's University
Chiba Prefectural Kounodai High School
 Ichikawa Municipal Daiichi Junior High School
 Ichikawa Municipal Second Junior High School

See also
 List of railway stations in Japan

References

External links

 Keisei Station information 

Railway stations in Japan opened in 1914
Railway stations in Chiba Prefecture
Keisei Main Line
Ichikawa, Chiba